The Wuhan dialect, also known as the Hankou dialect, belongs to the Wu–Tian branch of Southwest Mandarin spoken in Wuhan, Tianmen and surrounding areas in Hubei, China. The Wuhan dialect has limited mutual intelligibility with Standard Chinese. Grammatically, it has been observed to have a similar aspect system with Xiang Chinese.

Phonology

Tones
Like other Southwest Mandarin varieties, there are four tones. Words with the checked tone in Middle Chinese became the light level tone. 
 Dark level 55 (also 44）
 Light level 312 
 Rising 42 
 Falling 35
 Neutral

Media use

Wuhan dialect is used in the 2021 film Embrace Again, which is set in Wuhan. Embrace Again was filmed and released in two versions, one in Wuhan dialect and one in Standard Mandarin.

References

Culture in Hubei
Mandarin Chinese
Wuhan